San Fernando School District 35 is a public school district based in Pima County, Arizona.

External links
 

School districts in Pima County, Arizona